Patronato is an underground metro station on the Line 2 of the Santiago Metro, in Santiago, Chile. The tunnel that connects the station with Puente Cal y Canto metro station passes under the Mapocho River. The station is named after the neighborhood where it is located, which is Patronato.

The station was opened on 8 September 2004 as part of the extension of the line from Puente Cal y Canto to Cerro Blanco.

References

Santiago Metro stations
Railway stations opened in 2004
Santiago Metro Line 2